Madlenianum Opera and Theatre is an opera house and theatre located in Zemun, Belgrade, Serbia. It is the first privately owned opera and theater company both in Serbia and in Southeast Europe. It is located in Belgrade, Serbia, and was founded on 26 January 1999, by Madlena Zepter, wife of Philip Zepter, Serbian businessman. The name Madlenianum derives from Madlena Zepter's name.

History
It is situated in the Old city core of Zemun, which is Spatial Cultural-Historical Units of Great Importance of Serbia. The Theatre houses opera, ballet, concert programs, drama and musical repertoire.

Madlenianum was officially founded on 25 December 1997 by Gordan Dragović Černogorski opera and ballet director, and it is located in the building that previously housed the second stage of the National Theatre of Serbia. After seven years of work and five different stages of reconstruction, a completely refurbished, reconstructed and conceptually enriched edifice opened its doors to the public on 19 April 2005.

Productions
As of February 2013, the following operas, musicals and plays outside of the standard repertoire were produced at the Madlenianum. Premieres marked with "*" are still in the repertory.

Gallery

See also
 List of theatres in Serbia

Notes and references

External links

 
 

Theatres in Belgrade
Opera houses in Serbia
Theatres completed in 1997
Music venues completed in 1999
1999 establishments in Serbia